"Me and Your Mama" is a single by American rapper and singer Childish Gambino. It was released on November 10, 2016 worldwide, and is the first single from his third studio album "Awaken, My Love!"

It was noted by Billy Gill of A Nation of Billions and Graham Moore of Exeposé for Glover's powerful vocals and the melodic, hypnotizing instrumentals throughout the song.

The song begins with a slow, melodic beat; consisting of a constant synth of changing pitch and a delicate high hat and 808 beat. This beat stretches for the first two minutes of the song, all the while a harmony of female voices repeat "I'm in love when we are smoking that la la la la la". This first section acts as a juxtaposition to the main portion. Sixteen beats before the main section, the 808s become significantly louder and the high hats become significantly quicker, acting as a build up towards the electrifying main section. This section is filled with powerful vocals, including Glover screaming in a high pitched voice and a demon-like laughter appearing occasionally in the background. Glover sings about how he is desperately in love, and essentially cannot live without the woman he's singing about. Despite her flaws, she has an unbounded "hold" on him. Eventually, Glover ends his rant abruptly, as the beat changes into a melody even more fragile than the first, including light guitar strumming, tambourine and maracas, and includes no drums, synths or vocals. This is the lengthiest section of the song.  

The song was debuted live at Bonnaroo Music Festival on June 13, 2015.

Charts

Personnel

 Childish Gambino – vocals, percussion 
 Ludwig Göransson – bass, guitars, synths
 Chris Hartz – drums
 Ray Suen – guitars
 Brent Jones and the Bestlife Singers – choir
 Lynette Williams – B3 organ
 Zac Rae – moog synthesizer, B3 organ
 Per Gunnar Juliusson – Rhodes, piano
 Thomas Drayton – bass
 bLAck pARty – drum programming
 Şerban Ghenea - Mix

Certifications

References

External links

Lyrics of this song at Genius

2016 singles
2016 songs
Glassnote Records singles
Donald Glover songs
Songs written by Ludwig Göransson
Songs written by Donald Glover